Dillon Matthew Battistini (born 3 December 1977) is an English-born racecar driver from Ewell.

Career
Battistini competed in various classes of karting, finishing 3rd in the Junior European Championship and becoming the British Open Champion before moving to cars. In the Caterham R400 challenge in 2003, he won the most races and the driver of the year award, finishing 2nd in the Championship after being taken out from behind in the penultimate race at Brands Hatch which cost him the points lead considering his track position at the time. In 2006 and 2007 he raced in the Asian Formula Three Championship, finishing 4th his first year and winning the 2007 series championship and the most races on 5 race wins. After testing a Champ Car for Minardi Team USA and the subsequent unification of American Open Wheel Racing, Battistini signed to race in the Firestone Indy Lights Series (formerly the Indy Pro Series) for Panther Racing less than 10 days before the season was set to begin. Battistini won his first race in the series which was also his first race on an oval track at Homestead-Miami Speedway on 29 March 2008.
 On 24 May Battistini won the Firestone Freedom 100 at the Indianapolis Motor Speedway from the pole for his second win of the season. Later that week he revealed that he and his team are preparing for him to make his IndyCar Series debut later in 2008. He won two further races at Iowa and Kentucky. For the final race of the year, Battistini left the Panther team to race for Team Moore Racing. Battistini was presented with the Gregory and Appel 'Securing Tomorrow' Award for winning the most races in the season at the 2008 IRL Awards Evening in Las Vegas. He competed in the fourth race of the 2009 season in a one-off for Genoa Racing and has been attempting to find a ride in the IndyCar Series. Having been unable to do so, he made two Indy Lights oval race appearances in 2010 for Team PBIR and Bryan Herta Autosport.

He participated in an IndyCar test with Conquest Racing at Kentucky Speedway on 23 September 2011 and made his IndyCar Series debut with the team in the 2011 season's race at Kentucky.

Racing record

American open–wheel racing results
(key)

Indy Lights Series

IndyCar Series

 ''1 Cancelled after Dan Wheldon died from injuries sustained in a 15-car crash on lap 11.

References

External links
Dillon Battistini – professional racing driver

1977 births
English racing drivers
Asian Formula Three Championship drivers
IndyCar Series drivers
Indy Lights drivers
Living people
Conquest Racing drivers
Bryan Herta Autosport drivers
Team Moore Racing drivers
Panther Racing drivers